Maurice H. "Bo" Ellis (born August 8, 1954) is an American former professional basketball player.

After graduating from Chicago's Parker High School, Ellis, a 6-9 forward, played college basketball at Marquette University and won an NCAA Championship in 1977. An art major in college he received by going to class at Mount Mary College Fashion Design Program, Ellis created several different uniform designs worn by his team during the 1977 season.

After graduating, he played three seasons of professional basketball for the Denver Nuggets of the NBA, averaging 3.6 points per game. He later held coaching positions at Marquette and Chicago State University.

Recently, Ellis worked with the Chicago Public Schools' athletics administration.

Head coaching record

(*) Indicates record/standing at timeof resignation from Chicago State.

References

External links

1954 births
Living people
African-American basketball coaches
African-American basketball players
All-American college men's basketball players
American men's basketball coaches
American men's basketball players
Basketball coaches from Illinois
Basketball players from Chicago
Chicago State Cougars men's basketball coaches
College men's basketball head coaches in the United States
Denver Nuggets players
High school basketball coaches in the United States
Maine Lumberjacks players
Marquette Golden Eagles men's basketball coaches
Marquette Golden Eagles men's basketball players
Parade High School All-Americans (boys' basketball)
Power forwards (basketball)
Sarasota Stingers players
Washington Bullets draft picks
21st-century African-American people
20th-century African-American sportspeople